Amaryllis croca is a species of crustacean in the family Amaryllididae, and was first described in 2002 by James K. Lowry and Helen E. Stoddart.

It is a marine species found in the sublittoral zone in association with bryozoans on rock faces and wharf pilings at depths of 21-31 m, on the coastlines from South Australia to New South Wales.

References

External links
 Amaryllis croca occurrence data from GBIF

Crustaceans described in 2002
Taxa named by James K. Lowry
Malacostraca